Neferkahor was an ancient Egyptian pharaoh of the Eighth Dynasty during the First Intermediate Period. According to Egyptologists Jürgen von Beckerath and Darrell Baker, he was the eleventh king of this dynasty.
His name is attested on the Abydos King List (number 50) and on a black steatite cylinder seal of unknown provenance. His name is absent from the Turin King List, a lacuna affecting the 7th/8th dynasty where his name would have been listed.

References

External links
First Intermediate Period on Digital Egypt for Universities, Accessed April 19, 2014

22nd-century BC Pharaohs
Pharaohs of the Eighth Dynasty of Egypt